Fedail Güler (born 1972) is a Turkish world champion weightlifter competing in the lightweight division. He is the world record holder in –70 kg division with 160.0 kg in snatch event and with 350.0 kg in total achieved at the 1994 World Weightlifting Championships held in Istanbul, Turkey.

Born in Bulgaria of Turkish descent, he started to perform weightlifting in 1986.

Achievements
World Weightlifting Championships

European Weightlifting Championships

World Junior Weightlifting Championships

European Junior Weightlifting Championships

References

External links
Fedail Güler at Database Weightlifting

1972 births
Place of birth missing (living people)
Bulgarian Turks in Turkey
Living people
Turkish male weightlifters
World record setters in weightlifting
Weightlifters at the 1996 Summer Olympics
Olympic weightlifters of Turkey
European champions for Turkey
European Weightlifting Championships medalists
World Weightlifting Championships medalists